SNPO may refer to:

 People's Socialist Party of Montenegro
 Space Nuclear Propulsion Office